The discography of Lukas Graham, a Danish soul pop band, consists of four studio albums, one extended play, twenty-one singles, two promotional singles, twelve music videos and other album appearances. Launching their debut album in 2012 on Copenhagen Records, Lukas Graham quickly became the most popular live act in Denmark. That success translated to the rest of Europe and caught the attention of Warner Bros. Records who co-signed them in 2013. The band's music was first introduced worldwide with the release of their two singles "7 Years" and "Mama Said" in October 2015, with the former becoming their biggest hit single to date.

Studio albums

Extended plays

Singles

As lead artist

As featured artist

Promotional singles

Other charted songs

Notes

References

Discography
Pop music discographies
Discographies of Danish artists